The 2014–15 Pacific Tigers men's basketball team represented the University of the Pacific during the 2014–15 NCAA Division I men's basketball season. They played their home games at the Alex G. Spanos Center and were members of the West Coast Conference. The Tigers were led by second-year head coach Ron Verlin. They finished the season 12–19, 4–14 in WCC play to finish in a tie for ninth place. They lost in the first round of the WCC tournament to San Francisco.

Previous season 
The Tigers finished the season 18–16, 6–12 in WCC play to finish in a tie for eighth place. They lost in the first round of the WCC tournament to Santa Clara. They were invited to the CollegeInsider.com Tournament where they defeated Grand Canyon, Texas A&M Corpus–Christi and fellow WCC member San Diego to advance to the semifinals where they lost to Murray State.

Departures

Incoming Transfers

Recruiting Class of 2014

Recruiting Class of 2015

Roster

Schedule

|-
!colspan=9 style="background:#FF7F00; color:#000000;"|Exhibition

|-
!colspan=9 style="background:#000000; color:#FF7F00;"| Regular season

|-
!colspan=9 style="background:#FF7F00;"| WCC tournament

References

Pacific Tigers men's basketball seasons
Pacific